Barry Patrick Gallagher (born 7 April 1961) is an English former professional footballer who played as a midfielder. Active in the Football League for three clubs between 1977 and 1986, Gallagher made 189 career appearances, scoring 49 goals. After retiring as a player, Gallagher became a football coach.

Career
Gallagher began his career with Bradford City after graduating through their youth system, making 71 appearances in the Football League between 1977 and 1983. While at Bradford, Gallagher made three appearances on loan at Mansfield Town. After leaving Bradford in 1983, Gallagher signed for Halifax Town, making a further 115 League appearances during three seasons. Gallagher later played non-league football with Scarborough, and in Malta with Ħamrun Spartans. While at Ħamrun, Gallagher was the top scorer in the Maltese Premier League during the 1987–88 season, scoring 7 goals.

After retiring as a player, Gallagher became Assistant Manager to Neil Warnock at old club Scarborough.

References

1961 births
Living people
English footballers
Bradford City A.F.C. players
Mansfield Town F.C. players
Halifax Town A.F.C. players
Scarborough F.C. players
Ħamrun Spartans F.C. players
English Football League players
English expatriate footballers
Expatriate footballers in Malta
Association football midfielders